This article lists census-designated places (CDPs) in the U.S. state of Idaho. As of 2017, there were a total of 26 census-designated places in Idaho.

Census-Designated Places

References

See also
List of cities in Idaho
List of places in Idaho

 
Census-designated places
Idaho